= Changing Focus =

1997 book about Kodak by Alecia Swasy

Changing Focus: Kodak and the Battle to Save a Great American Company
- Author: Alecia Swasy
- Language: English
- Subject: Kodak
- Genre: Non-fiction
- Publisher: Crown Business
- Publication date: 1997
- Publication place: United States
- ISBN: 0-8129-2463-0

Changing Focus: Kodak and the Battle to Save a Great American Company is a book about the corporate history and future of the Kodak corporation. In particular, it discusses Kodak's efforts to maintain and diversity its photography businesses in the face of challenges from digital photography, and the mixed results of these efforts.
